Dorr and Dörr are surnames of German origin. Notable people include:

 Bert Dorr (1862–1914), American Major League Baseball pitcher
 Charles Dorr (1852–1914), U.S. Representative from West Virginia
 Ebenezer P. Dorr (1817–1882), American mariner and meteorologist
 Franz Dörr (1913–1972), German World War II fighter ace
 Friedrich Dörr (1908–1993), German Catholic priest, professor of theology and hymnwriter 
 Gustav Dörr (1887–1928), German World War I fighter pilot
 Hans Dorr (1912–1945), German Waffen-SS Obersturmbannführer
 John V. N. Dorr (1872–1962), American industrial chemist
 Julia Caroline Dorr (1825–1913), American author 
 Kevin Dorr, American musician
 Larry Dorr, manager of Blood, Sweat & Tears
 Laurence Joseph Dorr (b. 1953), American botanist
 Rheta Childe Dorr (1868–1948), American author and social worker
 Richard Everett Dorr (1943–2013), United States federal judge
 Robert F. Dorr (1939-2016), U.S. diplomat and author
 Thomas Wilson Dorr (1805–1854), leader of the Dorr Rebellion in Rhode Island
 Wilhelm Dörr (1881–1955), German track and field athlete
 Wilhelm Dörr (Nazi) (1921-1945), German SS and concentration camp officer executed for war crimes
 Stegath Dorr (1973-), American film producer/screenwriter/actor